The 1923 Creighton Blue and White football team was an American football team that represented Creighton University in the North Central Conference (NCC) during the 1923 college football season. In its first season under head coach Chet A. Wynne, the team compiled a 5–5 record (1–2 against conference opponents). The team played its home games in Omaha, Nebraska.

Schedule

References

Creighton
Creighton Bluejays football seasons
Creighton Blue and White football